Ukraine competed at the 2012 Summer Paralympics in London, United Kingdom, from 29 August to 9 September 2012.

Medallists

Archery

Men

|-
|align=left|Pavlo Nazar
|align=left|Men's individual compound open
|623
|26
|L 1-7
|colspan=5|did not advance
|-
|align=left|Roman Chayka
|rowspan=2 align=left|Men's individual recurve standing
|557
|23
|W 6-4
|W 7-3
|L 0-6
|colspan=3|did not advance
|-
|align=left|Yuriy Kopiy
|602
|13
|W 6-5
|W 6-5
|L 2-6
|colspan=3|did not advance
|-
|align=left|Taras Chopyk
|align=left|Men's individual recurve W1/W2
|561
|18
|W 7-3
|L 1-7
|colspan=4|did not advance
|-
|align=left|Roman Chayka Taras Chopyk Yuriy Kopiy
|align=left|Men's team recurve
|1720
|9
|
|L 183–194
|colspan=4|did not advance
|}

Women

|-
|align=left|Kseniya Markitantova
|align=left|Women's individual compound
|645
|5
|
|L 4-6
|colspan=4|did not advance
|-
|align=left|Dzoba-Balian Roksolana
|rowspan=2 align=left|Women's individual recurve
|552
|4
|Bye
|L 4-6
|colspan=4|did not advance
|-
|align=left|Iryna Volynets
|539
|6
|Bye
|L 4-6
|colspan=4|did not advance
|}

Athletics

Men's track

Men's field

Women's track

Women's field

Cycling

Men's road

Men's track

Football 7-a-side

Group play

Semi-final

Final

Judo

Men

Women

Powerlifting

Men

Women

Rowing

Shooting

Men

Women

Swimming

Men

Women

Table tennis

Men

Women

Teams

Volleyball

Women's tournament
Roster

Group play

Semi-final

Bronze medal match

Wheelchair fencing

See also
Ukraine at the Paralympics
Ukraine at the 2012 Summer Olympics

References

Nations at the 2012 Summer Paralympics
2012
2012 in Ukrainian sport